Live at the Loft & More is a 2005 album by Rachael Yamagata, released by BMG. It was produced by Kevin Salem except track 4, which was produced by John Alagía. The album was first released in Japan, before being released to US and UK audiences.

Track listing
 "Be Be Your Love" (Live at the Loft) – 4:44
 "These Girls / Would You Please" (Live at the Loft) – 10:39
 "Reason Why" (Live at the Loft) – 5:25
 "River"  – 4:25

Promo version

Live at the Loft is another live EP by Rachael Yamagata that was released for promotional use only by BMG in 2004. The album was recorded at the XM Performance Theater in Washington DC, and was also produced by Kevin Salem.

Track listing 
 "Sunday Afternoon"
 "Worn Me Down"
 "These Girls / Would You Please" (Medley)
 "Be Be Your Love"
 "Paper Doll"

Release history

External links
Rachael Yamagata official site
Amazon.com's page

2005 EPs
Rachael Yamagata albums
2005 live albums
Live EPs